Dal Joon Lee (May 30, 1939 in Wonju, South Korea – September 19, 2010) was an American table tennis player. He participated in four world championships in the 1960s and 1970s and won six consecutive U.S. Open Table Tennis Championships.

Career 
Dal Joon Lee began playing table tennis at the age of 8, after watching his older brothers and sisters. During the Korean War, his father, two brothers and a sister were killed. He continued playing table tennis soon after and, through intensive training, became a skilled player. He won the Korean Championship consecutively between 1960 and 1964.

He began playing professionally under the flag of South Korea. In 1960, he competed in the Asian Championships, where he came second in the men's singles tournament, losing to the Japanese player, Ichiro Ogimura. Previously in the competition, he had won victories against Japan's Nobuya Hoshino (then 16th in the world rankings) and Teruo Murakami (WRL 4th place).

At the Asian Games in 1962, he reached the final in the team competition. In 1964, he became the national South Korean champion. He then emigrated to the US.

In the mid-1960s, he performed in exhibition games along with Richard Bergmann for the Harlem Globetrotters.

From 1968 to 1973, Lee won the U.S. Open Table Tennis Championships six times in a row. Between 1969 and 1975, he was nominated for all four World Championships, but never came close to medal ranks.

In the season of 1977/78 he was an active player in Germany for the sports team TSV Selk.

In 1983, he was inducted into the Table Tennis Hall of Fame of the USA.

Personal life 
Dal Joon Lee married Linda Williams in 1967. They had a son together in 1968. In 1975, he entered into a second marriage with the South Korean table tennis player, He-Ja, who played in the mid-1970s at the German Bundesliga club TSV Kronshagen and participated in the 1979 World Table Tennis Championships. From this marriage, Lee had three children.

On September 19, 2010, Lee died of bile duct cancer at the age of 71.

Statistics from ITTF database

Literature 
Olaf Brockmann: Guests from South Korea, DTS Magazine, 1977/21 Issue North-East Page 6

External links 
 Obituary (retrieved on November 23, 2018)
 Profile within the US Hall of Fame (accessed on November 23, 2018)

References 

1939 births
2010 deaths
American male table tennis players
American sportspeople of Korean descent
People from Wonju